Kubilay is a Turkish name, which is the Turkish spelling of the name of Kublai, Great Khan of the Mongol Empire and founder of the Yuan dynasty in China. In modern use it may refer to:

 Kubilay Türkyilmaz, Swiss footballer
 Mustafa Fehmi Kubilay (1906–1930), Turkish teacher 

Turkish-language surnames
Turkish masculine given names

tr:Kubilay